Brachylophon is a genus of flowering plants belonging to the family Malpighiaceae.

Its native range is Tropical Asia.

Species:

Brachylophon anastomosans 
Brachylophon curtisii

References

Malpighiaceae
Malpighiaceae genera